Evert Louis van Muyden (18 July 1853 Albano, Lazio –  27 February 1922 Orsay) was a noted engraver, illustrator and painter, born to Swiss parents. His brothers, Albert-Steven van Muyden (1849-1910) and Henri van Muyden (1860-1936) were also artists.

Biography
At first studying with his father, the painter Jacques Alfred van Muyden (1818–1898), Evert later lived and studied in Geneva at the Beaux-Arts, under Carl Steffeck in Berlin and under Jean-Léon Gérôme at the Paris Beaux-Arts. He worked in Rome between 1879 and 1884, concentrating on landscapes, and showing the clear influence of Corot. After 1885, he worked in Paris painting animals in the style of Antoine-Louis Barye. He virtually lived at the Museum National d'Histoire Naturelle in Paris and the Zoologischer Garten in Basle, creating hundreds of drawings and engravings of plants and animals. He was sought after as an illustrator of books, providing images for Champfleury's Contes choisis (Paris, 1899) and Emil Frey's Die Kriegstaten der Schweizer (Neuchatel, 1905). His engravings and book illustrations remained popular, overshadowing his occasional portraits and sculptures.

Gallery

References

1853 births
1922 deaths
19th-century engravers
20th-century engravers
19th-century Swiss painters
Swiss male painters
20th-century Swiss painters
Swiss engravers
Swiss illustrators
19th-century Swiss male artists
20th-century Swiss male artists